Natalia Pertseva is a retired Russian football defender mostly played for Rossiyanka Krasnoarmeysk in the Russian Championship. She began her career in Nadezhda Noginsk.

She was a member of the Russian national team since 2002, taking part in the 2009 European Championship.

References

1984 births
Living people
Russian women's footballers
Russia women's international footballers
Nadezhda Noginsk players
WFC Rossiyanka players
Women's association football defenders
Russian Women's Football Championship players